Wendy Elizabeth Griner, later surname: Ballantyne (born April 16, 1944) is a Canadian former figure skater. She is the 1962 World silver medallist, the 1963 North American champion,  and a four-time (1960–63) Canadian national champion. She competed at the 1960 Winter Olympics in Squaw Valley and 1964 Winter Olympics in Innsbruck, placing 12th and 10th, respectively.

Griner was the youngest woman to represent Canada at the 1960 Winter Olympics; the youngest male was fellow figure skater Donald McPherson. She was one of the few skaters to win the Canadian junior and senior national titles in consecutive years.

Competitive highlights

References

 

1944 births
Canadian female single skaters
Figure skaters at the 1960 Winter Olympics
Figure skaters at the 1964 Winter Olympics
Olympic figure skaters of Canada
Living people
Sportspeople from Hamilton, Ontario
World Figure Skating Championships medalists
20th-century Canadian women
21st-century Canadian women